Colver may refer to:

Colver (surname), a surname
Colver, Pennsylvania, an unincorporated community and census-designated place in Cambria County, Pennsylvania, United States
Colver Historic District, a national historic district in Cambria County, Pennsylvania